Agar ... If is a 1977 Bollywood crime thriller film directed by Esmayeel Shroff.

Plot
Bombay-based Anil Agarwal lives a very wealthy lifestyle, mostly from wealth, estate, and business inherited from his grandfather, along with his wife, Anju, and a school-going son named Jimmy. One day while at the beach a stranger named Vijay Sohni, rescues Jimmy from drowning, refuses to accept any compensation, but is invited to live in the palatial house of the Agarwals indefinitely, which he accepts. Anil's garage owner friend, Daver, cautions him against Vijay, as he has been seen making advances to Daver's wife, Suman. Anil decides to pay close attention to Vijay, and does find him getting closer and closer to Anju. He decides to ask Vijay to leave, and even gives him some money, when Daver bursts in accusing Vijay of having an affair with Suman, an argument ensues, which regresses into fisticuffs, Anil hits Vijay on his head which leads to his death. Daver disposes of the body, and both decide not to tell anyone about Vijay's disappearance. Then a letter is received in Vijay's name from a man named Ashok Saxena, demanding that he repay his loan of one lakh rupees immediately. Anil travels to Poona, finds out where Ashok lives, and pays him the amount. Thereafter, Anil starts receiving phone calls from a man named Chaman who claims that he knows everything about Vijay's disappearance. As if things were not complicated enough, another male knocks on the Anil's door one day, identifies himself as Ashok Saxena. Anil now realizes that he cannot trust anyone, and feels that he has been dragged into a web of deceit, lies and deception, from where there is no way out.

Cast
The film stars:
Amol Palekar as Anil Agarwal
Zarina Wahab as Anju Agarwal
Kader Khan as Davar
Vijayendra Ghatge as Vijay Sohni
Tun Tun as Champakali (Agarwal Housemaid)
Jagdeep as School-teacher
Roohi Berde as Suman Daver
Brahm Bhardwaj as Mr. Agarwal (Anil's Father)
Krishan Dhawan as Ashok Saxena / Bhandari
Viju Khote as Fake Police Inspector
Manmohan Krishna as Police Commissioner
Shreeram Lagoo as Ashok Saxena
Keshto Mukherjee as Chaman
Raju Shrestha as Jimmy A. Agarwal
 Kumud Tripathi as Jamunadas
 Gulshan Bawra (special appearance) the man who tells day and time
 Maqsood as inspector in the graveyard

Music

External links
 

1977 films
1970s Hindi-language films
Films scored by Sonik-Omi